"Wall Street Rag" is a ragtime composition by Scott Joplin, first published in 1909. As indicated by the title, the theme is based on Wall Street following the events surrounding the Panic of 1907. This is represented in the musical structure along with its corresponding annotations.

History

In 1909, the "Wall Street Rag" by Scott Joplin was published. The copyright was registered February 23, 1909 to Seminary Music Co. of New York.

Musical structure
Intro A A B B C C D D 
Unlike most of his rags during this time, this composition is based on a major historical event and features footnotes unique to the theme of this piece. Moreover, this arrangement uses a “Very Slow March Time” rather than the “Slow March Time” used in his other compositions. The rag’s opening section begins with notes of Panic in Wall Street, Brokers feeling melancholy, representing the first phase of the recession. The next section of the rag moves from a Chopinesque chromatic style to the right-hand chords and bass octaves of Good times have come, providing an atmosphere of hope within the crisis. The rag finally closes with financial worries chased away during economic revitalization while folks Listening to the strains of genuine negro ragtime, brokers forget their cares.

Legacy
Ragtime scholar John E. Roache praised "Wall Street Rag", calling it "ragtime taken to a higher level."

See also 
 List of compositions by Scott Joplin

References

External links 
 Wall Street taps along to the deregulation beat
 Wall Street Rag | Library of Congress

1909 compositions
Rags by Scott Joplin
Compositions for solo piano
Compositions in C major
Songs about New York City